is a retired Japanese professional shogi player who achieved the rank of 8-dan.

Early life
Kōichi Kodama was born in Kitakyushu, Fukuoka Prefecture on February 21, 1951.

In October 1971, Kodama was accepted into the Japan Shogi Association's apprentice school at the rank of  3-kyū under the guidance of shogi professional . He was promoted to the rank of 1-dan in 1974 and finally obtained full professional status and the rank of 4-dan in January 1980.

Promotion history
Kodama's promotion history is as follows:

 1971: 3-kyū
 1974: 1-dan
 1980, January 7: 4-dan 
 1983, April 1: 5-dan
 1985, April 1: 6-dan 
 1996, January 18: 7-dan
 2011, August 10: retirement
 2016, April 1: 8-dan

Awards and honors
Kodama received the following Japan Shogi Association Annual Shogi Awards during his career: the Kōzō Masuda Award for 20022003, and the "Special Game of the Year" for 20092010. His "Masuda Award" was for his development of the Crab Silvers opening.

Kodama also received the Japan Shogi Association's "25 Years Service Award" in 2004.

References

Japanese shogi players
Living people
Retired professional shogi players
Recipients of the Kōzō Masuda Award
Professional shogi players from Fukuoka Prefecture
1951 births
People from Kitakyushu